SK Tallinna Sport is a defunct Estonian football club. Founded in 1912, Sport won nine domestic league titles and was the most successful Estonian football club before Estonia became a part of Soviet Union.

The club also played bandy in the interwar years, becoming Estonian champions of this sport eleven times in the 1920s and 1930s.

At last, Tallinna Sport played in the III Liiga (Pőhi), northern zone of Estonian Third league, fourth tier of Estonian football pyramid. The club finished 1st in 2007 and was dissolved after the beginning of the year 2008.

History

Early years (1912–1921) 
Sport was founded on 2 June 1912 as Tallinna Võimlemise Selts Sport by sports enthusiasts, who saw a need for a new sports club in Tallinn, as the only well-functioning club Talinna Kalev had an image of being an organisation for mostly affluent people. 

The newly formed sport organisation developed quickly, and was already very active in Tallinn's sports life by the summer of 1913. Tallinna Sport's first international football match took place on 4 May 1914 against Helsinki IFK. The game ended in a 4–4 draw. In the following years, Sport continued to play football matches against Finnish teams and thus grew close ties with Finland. These ties lead to Sport appointing Finnish international Verner Eklöf as their coach in 1921.

First Estonian champions & continuous domestic success (1921–1930) 
The first Estonian Football Championship took place in 1921 and was played as a knock-out tournament. Sport faced Tallinna Kalev in the semi-final and drew 1–1. After normal time, the match was to be played until the first goal, but after 130 minutes and no goals it was abandoned due darkness. The replay saw Sport win Kalev 3–0 after which they faced TJK in the final. Sport won the match 5–3 and were crowned the Estonian champions. Sport retained the title in the following year, beating Tallinna Kalev 4–2 in the final. 

By the third season, Sport and Kalev had grown into fierce rivals. By the fate of the draw, Sport faces Kalev in the semi-final. The highly anticipated match takes place in Kalev's new stadium. With tickets sold out, 5,000 spectators witness Kalev triumph against Sport 1–0. Kalev goes on to win the 1923 Championship. 

The following two seasons saw Sport Tallinn dominate in the Estonian Championship, again beating rivals Kalev in the 1924 and 1925 finals. After losing to TJK in the 1926 Championship final, Sport appointed Hungarian Antal Mally as their coach and defeated TJK in the 1927 final, thus winning their 5th title in seventh season. After a conflict with the Estonian FA, Sport, along with a couple of other teams, decided to not take part in the 1928 season, but returned in the following year and were crowned champions in 1929.

International success & dissolution (1930–1944) 
The 1930 season saw Sport lose the Championship title to Kalev, but the club returned to the throne in 1931, finishing the season unbeaten. Tallinna Sport retained the title in 1932 and 1933, where they finished one point clear of the newly formed JS Estonia Tallinn. That 1933 Championship title proved to be the last for Sport, as the following seasons were dominated by JS Estonia. Sport continued to be one of the top teams in Estonia, but were unable to win the title again before the Soviet occupation of Estonia put an end to the Estonian Football Championship in 1941.

The 1930s saw Sport also face several top European clubs. After losing 2–3 to Austria Vienna and their star player Matthias Sindelar in 1930, Tallinna Sport faced Barcelona CE Europa, who were the founding members of La Liga the year before. Sport drew 1–1 with the Spanish top division team. Sport also won Berlin FC Preussen 3–0 in 1931 and defeated Austrian club WAC, the finalist of the same year's Mitropa Cup, 3–1. That match is best remembered for the heroic performance of the Sport's legendary goalkeeper Evald Tipner.

In 1938, by Sport's initiative, the Estonian Cup competition was created, which Sport won by beating TJK in the final. The newspapers evaluated the actions of Evald Tipner again as the basis of Sport's victory.

Tallinna Sport was dissolved in 1944 after Estonia became a part of Soviet Union.

Tallinna Sport in Soviet football (1983–1989) 
Tallinna Sport's name reappeared in Estonian football in the 1980s. Named Tallinna FK Sport, the club took part in the Soviet Union's second division and finished eighth in the 1985 and 1988 seasons. The club was a stepping stone for numerous later Estonian internationals, such as Mart Poom, Marek Lemsalu, Martin Reim and Marko Kristal, as well as later Russian international and national team head coach Valery Karpin. Sport finished 20th out of 22 teams in the 1989 season and ceased its activities after that. Few years later, Estonia regained its independence.

In 2003, a group of people attempted to re-establish Tallinna Sport and entered the fifth tier of Estonian football. However, this initiative did not last long and the team was dissolved in 2008.

Honours

Estonian Championship
Champions (9): 1921, 1922, 1924, 1925, 1927, 1929, 1931, 1932, 1933

Estonian Cup
Winners: 1938

Sport Tallinn in Estonian Football

References

Defunct football clubs in Estonia
Association football clubs established in 1912
Association football clubs established in 2003
Bandy clubs established in 1912
Tallinnna Sport
1912 establishments in Estonia
2003 establishments in Estonia
2008 disestablishments in Estonia
Defunct bandy clubs in Estonia